DevConf.cz (Developer Conference) is an annual, free, Red Hat sponsored community conference for developers, admins, DevOps engineers, testers, documentation writers and other contributors to open source technologies. The conference includes topics on Linux, Middleware, Virtualization, Storage and Cloud. At DevConf.cz, FLOSS communities sync, share, and hack on upstream projects together in the city of Brno, Czech Republic. 

DevConf.cz is held annually, usually during the last weekend of January (one week before FOSDEM), at the Brno University of Technology Faculty of Information Technology campus.

The topics of the conference in 2020 were: Agile, DevOps & CI/CD, Cloud and Containers, Community, Debug / Tracing, Desktop, Developer Tools, Documentation, Fedora, Frontend / UI / UX, Kernel, Immutable OS, IoT (Internet of Things), Microservices, Middleware, ML / AI / Big Data, Networking, Platform / OS, Quality / Testing, Security / IdM, Storage / Ceph / Gluster and Virtualization.

Conference history

The Developer Conference started in 2009 and followed the FUDCon, the Fedora User and Developer conference.

 2009 
September 10–11 at Faculty of Informatics Masaryk University - focused on Linux developers, advanced users and developers of JBoss
33 talks and workshops
 JBoss topics like Jopr, jboss.org, Drools, Jbpm to Fedora topics like KDE and core utils
The keynote speakers were Radovan Musil and Radek Vokal
 2011 
February 11–12 at Faculty of Informatics Masaryk University 
Two parallel tracks
around 200 attendees

2012
February 17–18 at Faculty of Informatics Masaryk University
60 talks (95% in English)
more than 600 attendees 
GTK+ hackfest and GNOME Docs Sprint
 2013
February 23–24 at Faculty of Informatics Masaryk University 
60 talks, 18 lightning talks, 20 workshops 
around 700 attendees 
 2014
February 7–9 at Faculty of Informatics Masaryk University 
 6 parallel tracks (3 talk tracks and 3 workshop tracks)
 more than 1000 attendees 
 The keynote speaker was Tim Burke from Red Hat
 2015
February 6–8 at Faculty of Information Technology Brno University of Technology
 154 workshops and talks
 more than 1000 attendees
 8 parallel tracks (5 talk tracks and 3 workshop tracks)
 Winners of the Winter of Code competition were announced
 The keynote speakers were Tim Burke, a vice president of Red Hat engineering, and Mark Little, a vice president of Red Hat engineering and CTO of JBoss Middleware
 2016
 February 5–7 at Faculty of Information Technology Brno University of Technology
 203 workshops and talks
 1600 attendees
 8 parallel tracks (5 talk tracks and 3 workshop tracks)
 Keynote speakers: Tim Burke, Jan Wildeboer, Denise Dumas and Matthew Miller
 2017
 January 27-29  at Faculty of Information Technology Brno University of Technology
 220 talks, workshops, keynotes across 20 tracks, 30 lightning talks
 3-5 sessions for Storage, Cloud, Networking, .net and Desktop
 6-10 sessions for Microservices, OpenStack, Testing, DevTools, Virtualization, DevOps and Agile
 11-15 sessions for Config Management, Linux and OpenShift
 JUDCon had 18 sessions
 Security, Fedora and Containers each had around 20 sessions
 1600 attendees
 13 community project booths, 4 community meetups
2018
January 26-28 at Faculty of Information Technology Brno University of Technology
3 keynotes, 215 talks and discussions and 26 workshops across 20 tracks
15 community project booths, 6 community meetups
Keynote speakers: Chris Wright, Hugh Brock, Michael McGrath, Jim Perrin, Matthew Miller
1600 attendees
2019
January 25-27 at Faculty of Information Technology Brno University of Technology
273 talks and workshops
18 meetups and 6 activities
1500 attendees
2020
January 24-26 at Faculty of Information Technology Brno University of Technology
3 keynotes, 210 talks, 11 discussions, 23 workshops across 21 tracks
20 community project booths, 12 community meetups and 5 fun activities
Keynote speakers: Leslie Hawthorn, William Benton & Christoph Goern, Karanbir Singh & Jeremy Eder
1600 attendees

Financing
Entrance and participation in the event is entirely free. It is financed by variety of teams of Red Hat. The event is mainly organized and run by volunteers.

See also
List of free-software events
FOSDEM

References

External links

Schedule of DevConf.cz 2015
DevConf.cz 2018 schedule
Devconf.cz 2019 schedule
Devconf.cz 2020 schedule

Linux conferences
Free-software conferences
Recurring events established in 2009